Kilyana is a genus of spiders in the family Zoropsidae. It was first described in 2005 by Raven & Stumkat. , it contains 10 species, all found either in Queensland or in New South Wales.

Species
Kilyana comprises the following species:
Kilyana bicarinatus Raven & Stumkat, 2005
Kilyana campbelli Raven & Stumkat, 2005
Kilyana corbeni Raven & Stumkat, 2005
Kilyana dougcooki Raven & Stumkat, 2005
Kilyana eungella Raven & Stumkat, 2005
Kilyana hendersoni Raven & Stumkat, 2005
Kilyana ingrami Raven & Stumkat, 2005
Kilyana kroombit Raven & Stumkat, 2005
Kilyana lorne Raven & Stumkat, 2005
Kilyana obrieni Raven & Stumkat, 2005

References

Zoropsidae
Araneomorphae genera
Spiders of Australia